4-Hydroxybenzoic acid 4-O-glucoside is a glucoside of p-hydroxybenzoic acid. It can be found in mycorrhizal (Picea abies-Lactarius deterrimus and Picea abies-Laccaria amethystina) and non-mycorrhizal roots of Norway spruces (Picea abies).

The enzyme 4-hydroxybenzoate 4-O-beta-D-glucosyltransferase can be found in the pollen of Pinus densiflora.

References

External links

Monohydroxybenzoic acids
Phenolic acid glucosides